Lawrenceville is a city in and the county seat of Gwinnett County, Georgia, United States. As of the 2020 census, the population of Lawrenceville was 30,629. In 2019, the U.S. Census Bureau estimated the city population to be 30,834. Lawrenceville has six ZIP codes (30042-30046, 30049), and it is part of the 678/770/404 telephone area code, which is used throughout metropolitan Atlanta.

History
Lawrenceville was incorporated by an act of the Georgia General Assembly on December 15, 1821. This makes Lawrenceville the second oldest city in the metropolitan Atlanta area. The city is named after Commodore James Lawrence, commander of the frigate Chesapeake during the War of 1812. Lawrence, a native of New Jersey, is probably best known today for his dying command, "Don't give up the ship!" William Maltbie, the town's first postmaster, suggested the name of "Lawrenceville."

In 1821, a permanent site for the county courthouse was selected and purchased, the four streets bordering the square were laid out along with other streets in the village, and a public well was dug. Major Grace built the first permanent courthouse, a brick structure, in 1823–24 for a cost of $4,000. The courthouse presently on the square was constructed in 1885.

During the Civil War, Gwinnett County voted against secession. The county seat of Lawrenceville sent three delegates who unanimously voted against it. This was due to a low slave population with a ratio of 4 whites to 1 slave. Lawrenceville helped contribute to the Confederate war effort. The Lawrenceville Manufacturing Company, a cotton mill built in the 1850s, produced completed textile products such as uniforms. Although Lawrenceville would see no battles throughout the war, the city would be targeted by General Sherman's famous March to the Sea, falling to frequent raids. The Lawrenceville Manufacturing Company would be burned down by Union soldiers, causing a serious blow to the city's commercial sector. By the end of the war, half of the wealth of Lawrenceville was lost by the Civil War.

Courtland Winn served two terms as mayor starting in 1884 when he was 21 years old.

The two most famous people born in Lawrenceville gained their fame elsewhere. Charles Henry Smith, born in 1826, left as a young man and lived most of his life in other Georgia towns. During the Civil War he wrote humorous pieces for Atlanta newspapers under the name Bill Arp. He has been described as the South's most popular writer of the late 19th century, though he is not much read today. Ezzard Charles, born in 1921, grew up in Cincinnati, where opportunities for African-Americans were far better at the time than in the Deep South. He eventually became the World Heavyweight boxing champion by defeating Joe Louis by unanimous decision on September 27, 1950.

Another resident, Oliver Hardy, became a world-renowned comic actor, a member of the film duo Laurel and Hardy from the 1920s to the 1940s. He lived as a child in downtown Lawrenceville around 1900. But his stay was brief since his family moved often within Georgia.

Lawrenceville was one of many venues in the nation where Hustler magazine publisher Larry Flynt faced obscenity charges in the late 1970s. On March 6, 1978, during a lunch break in his Lawrenceville trial, he and his local attorney Gene Reeves were shot by a sniper near the courthouse. Both survived, though Flynt was seriously disabled. Years later, imprisoned serial killer Joseph Paul Franklin claimed to have been the shooter, but he never produced any proof and was not charged in the case. (Franklin was executed in 2013 in Missouri for a 1977 sniper slaying.) A heavily fictionalized treatment of the Flynt shooting can be seen in the 1996 movie The People vs. Larry Flynt.

Since 1988, Lawrenceville has been the headquarters of the Presbyterian Church in America.

Geography
Lawrenceville is located in central Gwinnett County at  (33.953052, −83.992469).

Nearby cities are Dacula to the east, Buford to the north, Suwanee to the north-northwest, Duluth to the northwest, Norcross to the west, Lilburn to the southwest, Snellville to the south, and Grayson to the southeast.

Climate
Lawrenceville has a humid subtropical climate (Köppen climate classification Cfa).

Demographics

2020 census

As of the 2020 United States census, there were 30,629 people, 10,524 households, and 7,071 families residing in the city.

2010 census
As of 2010 Census, Lawrenceville had a population of 28,546.  The median age was 32.4.  The racial composition of the population was 48.0% white, 32.0% black or African American, 0.6% Native American, 1.1% Asian Indian, 4.7% other Asian, 10.3% from some other race, and 3.4% from two or more races. 22.3% of the population was Hispanic or Latino of any race.

In the city, the population was spread out, with 26.4% under the age of 18, 11.0% from 18 to 24, 35.3% from 25 to 44, 18.2% from 45 to 64, and 9.1% who were 65 years of age or older. The median age was 32 years. For every 100 females, there were 105.1 males. For every 100 females age 18 and over, there were 103.9 males.

The median income for a household in the city was $32,779, and the median income for a family was $38,557. Males had a median income of $27,263 versus $24,903 for females. The per capita income for the city was $18,649. About 28.7% of families and 40.5% of the population were below the poverty line, including 16.0% of those under age 18 and 11.9% of those age 65 or over.

Transportation

Roads and expressways
Lawrenceville can be accessed through several highways. Georgia 316 passes through Lawrenceville to Athens and connects to Interstate 85 at Exit 106. Interstate 85 South then travels through Atlanta, which is roughly 25 to 30 miles distant to the southwest. Lawrenceville can also be accessed by U.S. 78 (Stone Mountain Freeway) and then Scenic Highway (Georgia 124) via Snellville. Some southern unincorporated areas with Lawrenceville addresses can be accessed by Ronald Reagan Parkway. Other highways that pass through Lawrenceville are US 29, GA 8, GA 20, and GA 120.

Transit systems
Xpress GA/ RTA Commuter buses and Gwinnett County Transit serve the city.

Pedestrians and cycling
Currently, Lawrenceville has limited walkability options available. However, in October 2017 plans were announced for the formation of a 2.2 mile linear park that will connect Georgia Gwinnett College with the downtown district.

 Ivy Creek-Snellville Trail (Proposed)
 Piedmont Pathway (Proposed)

Airport
Lawrenceville is home to Gwinnett County's only public airport, Gwinnett County Airport-Briscoe Field  . With its daytime control tower, several FBOs (Fixed-Base Operators), and flight-training schools, Brisco Field primarily serves general aviation and some commercial aircraft.

Education
Gwinnett County Public Schools operates public schools.

Schools with Lawrenceville mailing address
The following is a list of schools with a Lawrenceville mailing address, with its high school cluster in parenthesis.

Elementary schools

 J.A. Alford Elementary School (Discovery)
 Baggett Elementary School (Discovery)
 Benefield Elementary School (Discovery)
 Bethesda Elementary School (Berkmar)
 Cedar Hill Elementary School (Discovery)
 Corley Elementary School (Berkmar)
 Craig Elementary School (Brookwood)
 Gwin Oaks Elementary School (Brookwood)
 Lawrenceville Elementary School (Central Gwinnett)
 Simonton Elementary School (Central Gwinnett)
 Kanoheda Elementary School (Berkmar)
 Margaret Winn Holt Elementary School (Central Gwinnett)
 Jackson Elementary School (Peachtree Ridge)
 Woodward Mill Elementary School (Mountain View)
 Freeman's Mill Elementary School (Mountain View)
 Lovin Elementary School (Archer)
 K.E. Taylor Elementary School (Collins Hill)
 McKendree Elementary School (Collins Hill) 
 Jenkins Elementary School (Central Gwinnett)
 Rock Springs Elementary School (Collins Hill)

Middle schools
 Moore Middle School (Central Gwinnett)
 J.E. Richards Middle School (Discovery)
 Creekland Middle School (Collins Hill)
 Jordan Middle School (Central Gwinnett)
 Five Forks Middle School (Brookwood)
 Alton C. Crews Middle School (Brookwood)
 Sweetwater Middle School (Berkmar)

High schools
 Archer High School
 Central Gwinnett High School
 Discovery High School
 Gwinnett School of Mathematics, Science, and Technology
 Maxwell High School
 Mountain View High School 
 Phoenix High School

Other schools
 Gwinnett Intervention Education (GIVE) Center East 
 Hooper-Renwick School
 Sola Fide Academy

Colleges and university
Within Lawrenceville are two public colleges:
Gwinnett Technical College
Georgia Gwinnett College

Libraries
Gwinnett County Public Library operates the Collins Hill, Five Forks and Lawrenceville branches. The Five Forks and Collins Hill branches are in an unincorporated area.

Hospitals
Lawrenceville is home to Northside Hospital Gwinnett (formerly Gwinnett Medical Center). GMC is a non-profit, 500-bed health care network based in Gwinnett County. It comprises two hospitals, plus several supporting medical facilities, with more than 4,300 employees and more than 800 affiliated physicians. The flagship campus of GMC is located in Lawrenceville near the intersection of Hwy. 316 and Duluth Highway 120.

Prior to the opening of Gwinnett Medical Center in 1984, the area was served by Button Gwinnett Hospital, which was later converted to an inpatient mental health and substance abuse treatment facility.

Arts and culture

Historically significant buildings in downtown Lawrenceville include the Gwinnett Historic Courthouse and Lawrenceville Female Seminary. Also downtown are various landmarks and antique locations.

Lawrenceville's revitalization plan was strengthened in 2005 when the city crafted a unique partnership with Aurora Theatre (Gwinnett County's only professional theatre), which relocated from the nearby town of Duluth to a permanent site in downtown Lawrenceville in May 2007 for the opening of its 11th season. Now in its 23rd season, Aurora Theatre (http://www.auroratheatre.com/), is the second largest professional theatre in Georgia, produces 800 ticketed events a year, attracts 80,000 visitors, and conducts the Lawrenceville Ghost Tours, a 90-minute walking tour of the historic downtown area led by professional storytellers. Ghost tour guides recount town lore and legends including reports of paranormal activity at the historic courthouse and the Female Seminary. Co-Founded in 1996 by Anthony Rodriguez and Ann-Carol Pence, Aurora Theatre works to be both a community partner and destination location. On the brink of another campus expansion, the new expanded Lawrenceville Performing Arts Center, when completed, will house four performance spaces and encompass an entire city block of Lawrenceville's historic downtown.

Each August, the city hosts the annual Polish Pierogi Festival. There are food booths set up serving pierogi, kielbasa and sauerkraut. There are also live music performances, and other events include the Pierogi Toss and eating competitions.

Economy
Scientific Atlanta, now owned by Cisco Systems, is based near Lawrenceville.

Atlanta Biologicals is located in Lawrenceville.

Peach State Federal Credit Union headquartered in Lawrenceville serves 39,800 members across Barrow, Clarke, DeKalb, Forsyth, Gwinnett, Jackson, Oconee and Walton Counties.

Sports
The Triple-A Minor League Baseball Gwinnett Stripers of the International League play at Coolray Field.

Notable people

Ric Flair, retired professional wrestler
Moisés Arias, television and film actor
Jonathan Babineaux, former NFL defensive tackle
Ezzard Charles, boxing champion who defeated Joe Louis
Wes Chatham, actor, The Help and Barbershop
EJay Day, singer, finalist on first season of American Idol
Carder England, poker player
Rachel Farley, country music singer
Jennifer Ferrin, actress
Rachel G. Fox, teen actress
Jeff Francoeur, former MLB right fielder
Kelly Gissendaner, murderer executed in Georgia
Taylor Heinicke, quarterback for the Washington Commanders
Russell Horning, dancer
Ricardo Hurtado, teen actor known for School of Rock
Hamilton Jordan, Chief of Staff to President Jimmy Carter
Michael Kelly, actor, House of Cards
Jonathan Massaquoi, former NFL football player
 Jimmy Maurer, soccer player
Brian McCann, former MLB catcher
Migos, rap group
Grace Min, tennis player
Maya Moore, basketball player, forward for the Minnesota Lynx
Raju Rai, badminton national champion
Ted Roof, football coach
Junior Samples, comedian
Kobe Smith, NFL player
Christin Stewart, MLB baseball player
Cassandra Trenary, ballet dancer
Darius Walker, football player
Courtland Winn, politician and lawyer
Rob Woodall, politician and former member of U.S. House of Representatives
Walker Zimmerman, soccer player

References

External links

 
Georgia.gov: Lawrenceville

Cities in Georgia (U.S. state)
Cities in Gwinnett County, Georgia
County seats in Georgia (U.S. state)
Populated places established in 1821